Dustin Brown and Paul Hanley were the defending champions, but they decided not to compete together this year.
Brown played alongside Christopher Kas and defeated Hanley and Lukáš Dlouhý in the first round.
Julian Knowle and Filip Polášek won the title, defeating Brown and Kas in the final, 6–3, 6–2.

Seeds

Draw

Draw

References
 Main Draw

Doubles